Lizelle Lee (born 2 April 1992) is a South African cricketer who played for the South Africa women's national cricket team from 2013 to 2022. She has played for Western Storm and Surrey Stars in the Women's Cricket Super League, as well as Melbourne Stars, Melbourne Renegades and Hobart Hurricanes in the Women's Big Bash League. Lee is an opening batter. In January 2022, Lee was named the ICC Women's ODI Cricketer of the Year. In July 2022, Lee announced her retirement from international cricket.

Domestic and franchise career
Lee has played for Western Storm and Surrey Stars in the English Women's Cricket Super League. She was part of the Stars team that lost their 2017 Women's Cricket Super League semi-final to Western Storm. In the 2018 Women's Cricket Super League final, Lee scored 104 off 58 balls to help the Stars beat Loughborough Lightning. In September 2019, she was named in the M van der Merwe XI squad for the inaugural edition of the Women's T20 Super League in South Africa.

Lee represented Melbourne Stars for three seasons in the Australian Women's Big Bash League (WBBL). She made 40 appearances for the Stars, scoring 1,100 runs. In her first match of the 2018–19 Women's Big Bash League season, Lee scored 102* from 56 balls. It was her third career century in Twenty20 cricket, and her first in the WBBL. Ahead of the 2020–21 Women's Big Bash League season, Lee joined Melbourne Renegades, replacing Jess Duffin who was on maternity leave. In 2021, she was drafted by Manchester Originals for the inaugural season of The Hundred. She was the leading run scorer of Manchester Originals with 215 runs in the tournament.

In April 2022, she was bought by the Manchester Originals for the 2022 season of The Hundred.

International career
Lee made her debut for the South Africa women's national cricket team against Bangladesh in 2013. In March 2018, she was one of fourteen players to be awarded a national contract by Cricket South Africa ahead of the 2018–19 season. In May 2018, during the series against Bangladesh Women, she became the third player for South Africa Women to score 2,000 runs in WODIs.

In October 2018, she was named in South Africa's squad for the 2018 ICC Women's World Twenty20 tournament in the West Indies. In February 2019, Lee was withdrawn from the South Africa squad for their series against Sri Lanka due to fitness concerns. Later in the year, Lee scored 75* off 48 balls in the fifth match of the 2019 series against Pakistan to help South Africa win the series 3–2. In October 2019, Lee scored 84 from 47 balls in South Africa's fifth T20I in India. South Africa won the match by 105 runs, but lost the series 3–1.

In January 2020, she was named in South Africa's squad for the 2020 ICC Women's T20 World Cup in Australia. In South Africa's match against Thailand, Lee scored her first century in WT20I cricket, with 101 runs. It was the fastest century by a South African woman in Twenty20 cricket. On 23 July 2020, Lee was named in South Africa's 24-woman squad to begin training in Pretoria, ahead of their tour to England.

In February 2022, she was named in South Africa's team for the 2022 Women's Cricket World Cup in New Zealand. On 31 March 2022, in the semi-final match against England, Lee played in her 100th WODI match.

In July 2022, Lee announced her retirement from international cricket.

International centuries

One Day International centuries

T20 International centuries

Personal life
Lee married long-term partner Tanja Cronje in September 2020. Their wedding had been planned for April 2020, but was postponed due to the COVID-19 pandemic. Lee and Cronje had their first child in 2022.

See also
 List of centuries in women's One Day International cricket
 List of centuries in women's Twenty20 International cricket

References

External links

 
 

1992 births
Living people
Mpumalanga women cricketers
North West women cricketers
Somerset women cricketers
South African women cricketers
South Africa women Test cricketers
South Africa women One Day International cricketers
South Africa women Twenty20 International cricketers
South Africa women's national cricket team captains
Western Storm cricketers
Surrey Stars cricketers
People from Ermelo, Mpumalanga
Melbourne Renegades (WBBL) cricketers
Melbourne Stars (WBBL) cricketers
Hobart Hurricanes (WBBL) cricketers
LGBT cricketers
Manchester Originals cricketers
Wicket-keepers
Wisden Leading Woman Cricketers in the World